Al-Rabīʾ ibn Yūnus ibn ʿAbd Allāh ibn Abī Farwa (– 785/6) was a freedman who became one of the leading ministers of the early Abbasid Caliphate, serving under the caliphs al-Mansur, al-Mahdi and al-Hadi.

Al-Rabi’ was born to a slave woman near Medina about 730 CE. His father Yunus, the scion of a well-to-do family, denied his paternity, and the infant was sent to another family and eventually to an estate in the desert where he was reduced to menial labour. He was however bought by Ziyad ibn Abd Allah al-Harithi, the governor of Medina, who in turn presented him as a gift to al-Saffah, the first Abbasid caliph. He is often mentioned in the histories as a powerful figure, controlling access to the Caliph, and a capable administrator. He supervised the construction of Karkh, the commercial extramural suburb of Baghdad, as well as the so-called Palace of Eternity (Qasr al-Khuld), where the Caliphs preferred to stay. Al-Rabi' even received from al-Mansur one quarter of the new city as a grant and named after him.

When Abu Ubayd Allah insulted him during a visit, al-Rabi’ brought about the former's downfall in 779/780, by accusing and proving his son to be a non-believer. He did not return to the post of vizier, however, until the reign of al-Hadi, when for a short while he was vizier,  and head of the chancery. He died in early 785 or early 786. His son al-Fadl occupied a similarly influential position in the court of Harun al-Rashid after him.

Sources 
 
 

730s births
780s deaths
Viziers of the Abbasid Caliphate
Abbasid people of the Arab–Byzantine wars
8th-century Arabs